Petar Lazarov (born 23 November 1985) is a Bulgarian footballer, currently playing as a midfielder for Pirin Razlog.

External links 
 

1985 births
Living people
Bulgarian footballers
First Professional Football League (Bulgaria) players
Second Professional Football League (Bulgaria) players
FC Sportist Svoge players
PFC Lokomotiv Plovdiv players
FC Spartak Plovdiv players
PFC Pirin Gotse Delchev players
FC Montana players
PFC Chernomorets Burgas players
FC Pirin Razlog players
FC Bansko players
Association football midfielders